Toshihiro Hasegawa is a Japanese freestyle wrestler. He won one of the bronze medals in the men's 61 kg event at the 2021 World Wrestling Championships held in Oslo, Norway.

In 2018, he won one of the bronze medals in the men's 57 kg event at the Asian Wrestling Championships held in Bishkek, Kyrgyzstan. In that same year, he also won the gold medal in the men's 57 kg event at the 2018 U23 World Wrestling Championships held in Bucharest, Romania.

References

External links 
 

Living people
1996 births
Sportspeople from Tokyo
Japanese male sport wrestlers
Asian Wrestling Championships medalists
World Wrestling Championships medalists
21st-century Japanese people